Caryanda neoelegans is a species of grasshoppers in the tribe Oxyini, found in Indochina and eastern China.

References

External links 

neoelegans
Insects described in 1995
Orthoptera of Asia